Sheykh Jasem (also Romanized as  Sheykh Jāsem; also known as Beyt-e Jāsem, and Sādāt Fāz̧el-e Yek) is a village in Seyyed Abbas Rural District, Shavur District, Shush County, Khuzestan Province, Iran. At the 2006 census, its population was 674, in 108 families.

References 

Populated places in Shush County